Ruby Phillips Duncan (born June 7, 1932 in Tallulah, Louisiana) is an activist fighting for welfare rights for the poor in Las Vegas, Nevada. She was also the co-founder of the organization Operation Life and President of the Clark County Welfare Rights Organization.

Early life: 1932–1953 

Her parents were poor black sharecroppers, and the majority of her early life was spent laboring in the cotton fields from May through October and attending a black school eight miles away from November through April. Both her parents had died by the time she turned four and from that point on she lived with relatives in Tallulah.

She left Louisiana for Las Vegas in 1953 to live with an aunt, working as a house maid and later as a hotel maid.

First years in Las Vegas 

Duncan worked as a house maid until 1959, at which point she found a job as a hotel maid. She was fired from this job in 1964 for organizing other maids in order to protest against their working conditions and low wages. After being fired, the only source of income she had to support herself and her young children was the meager Aid to Dependent Children (ADC) grant she received from the state welfare system. After a while she was able to get a job working in the pantry of a hotel on the strip. However, while on the job, she slipped and fell, injuring her back and rendering her unable to do heavy work. She contacted the State Welfare Department asking for job training so that she could get hired in a job that did not require physical labor but the department was reluctant. Finally she was able to get into a federal training program which was later shut down with no explanation.

In 1967 Congress passed new amendments requiring all women on Aid to Families with Dependent Children to enroll in job training programs.  The only program available to welfare mothers on the Westside of Las Vegas, where Duncan lived, was a sewing class that met five days a week eight hours a day and paid $25 a week.  This is where Duncan became radicalized and mobilized with other welfare mothers.  She sat in the front row of the class, and she and the other mothers began to talk and share their stories, experiences, and frustration with welfare. This sewing class was central in Ruby Duncan's radicalization and activism, as this class was where she and the other welfare mothers were able to voice their opinions and bond with each other. The women in the class eventually banded together to form what became Clark County Welfare Rights.

Nevada Welfare Rights Organization 

Ruby Duncan, along with other black welfare mothers, led the movement for Welfare Rights in Las Vegas. She created the Nevada Welfare Rights Organization and together she and the group fought to bring the Supplemental Nutrition Assistance Program (formerly known as the Federal Food Stamps Program) and the Special Supplemental Nutrition Program for Women Infants and Children, or WIC, to Nevada.  Through their protests, political activism, and perseverance, they succeeded in these goals. George Wiley trained members of the new group, and many young attorneys volunteered for the group to give legal advice.  The group, led by Ruby Duncan, Mary Wesley, Alversa Beals, Emma Stampley, and Essie Henderson, organized many protests, eat-ins, marches, speeches, and political events to advocate for those receiving welfare and for women's rights.

Activism and the Strip 

In 1971 the state of Nevada cut 75% of welfare given to women with children. Ruby Duncan was infuriated by this and organized with other welfare mothers she had met and worked with, especially those from Clark County Welfare Rights and the Nevada Welfare Rights Organization. She began organizing small demonstrations and finally organized two marches of welfare mothers and their children down the Las Vegas Strip.

In the first march, Duncan organized upwards of 6000 people to march together down the Las Vegas Strip with the goal of shutting down revenues to the Casinos for at least an hour to show the government how serious the welfare mothers were and to make the injustice public. The welfare mothers invited celebrities and well known activists like Jane Fonda, Donald Sutherland, Ralph Abernathy, Cesar Chavez, Dr. Benjamin Spock, and Dave Dellinger, in order to protect themselves from police and bystander abuse during the protest.  On March 6, 1971, Ruby Duncan and the welfare mothers, their children, and hundreds of allies marched down the Las Vegas Strip and effectively cut off business from most of the casinos, including Caesars Palace, for several hours.

The march was successful, and gained a lot of attention from local and national news. Duncan and the other welfare mothers and the NWRO organized eat-ins, at which dozens of welfare mothers and their children would sit down at casino restaurants, order food, eat, and then leave, telling the casinos to bill the state government. The casinos footed the bills, and two weeks after the initial eat-in, a federal judge mandated that all of the mothers that had been dropped from welfare be re-added immediately.

Ruby Duncan also served as a Democratic Delegate for Nevada at the 1980 Democratic National Convention.

Operation Life 

Ruby Duncan co-founded Operation Life in 1972. The organization no longer exists. It ended in 1992

Recognition 

She has received multiple awards and honors, and have amongst others been proclaimed a Distinguished Nevadan, received honorary degrees from the University of Nevada, Las Vegas and from the Community College of Southern Nevada.
She has also received the "Freedom Tree" award, from the University of Nevada Reno in 2009. This award was given to her for all of her accomplishments from the then Vice President MarQuez Eagles, of the college's Undergraduate School of Social Work Association (USSWA).
Recently she was honored by Steven Horsford on the House Floor during Women's History Month.

References

External links
A Guide to the Ruby Duncan Papers, 93-48. Special Collections, University Libraries, University of Nevada, Reno.

Living people
1932 births
People from Tallulah, Louisiana
Activists from Louisiana
Activists from Nevada